Danielle W. Gregoire is an American state legislator serving in the Massachusetts House of Representatives. She is a Marlborough resident and a member of the Democratic Party.

Early life and education 
Gregoire attended Marlborough Public Schools. She received her bachelor's degree in Criminal Justice from St. Anselm College in Manchester, New Hampshire. Upon graduating from St. Anselm, Gregoire served as a legislative aide to State Representative Stephen P. LeDuc. While working for Representative LeDuc, Gregoire attended night classes at Suffolk University Law School where she graduated in 2006. Gregoire passed the Massachusetts bar exam.

Political career 
In 2007, Gregoire was a candidate to represent Ward 2 in the Marlborough City Council. She lost her challenge to incumbent City Councilor Paul Ferro by 74 votes. In 2008, she ran to succeed her former boss in the Massachusetts House of Representatives. Gregoire received 9,044 votes defeating Republican challenger Arthur G. Vigeant and Independent challenger Joseph Valianti. In 2010, Gregoire narrowly lost her reelection bid to Republican challenger Steven L. Levy. Gregoire and Levy faced off again in a rematch for the 4th Middlesex district seat in 2012, this time Gregoire edged out Levy by 214 votes. She has been reelected to the seat in 2014, 2016, 2018, 2020 and 2022.

See also
 Massachusetts House of Representatives' 4th Middlesex district
 2019–2020 Massachusetts legislature
 2021–2022 Massachusetts legislature

References

Living people
Democratic Party members of the Massachusetts House of Representatives
People from Marlborough, Massachusetts
Women state legislators in Massachusetts
21st-century American politicians
21st-century American women politicians
1979 births